Hosam al-Din Ali Bitlisi Nurbakhshi (died 1494/95) was a Kurdish Sufi author. He was the father of the noted historian Idris Bitlisi. 

According to Tahsin Yazici / Encyclopædia Iranica, nothing is known about Hosam al-Din's early life; however, he adds that his works bear evidence to the fact that he was well educated and was well versed in both Persian and Arabic. Either prior to completing his education, or after that, Hosam al-Din became a member of the Sufi Nurbakhshi order. The Nurbakhshi order itself was a branch of the Kobrawiya order (founded by Najm al-Din Kobra). Yazici considers it likely that Hosam al-Din became a follower and in turn the eventual successor of the so-called "actual" founder of the order; Mohammad Nurbakhsh (died 1465).

He died in Bitlis in 1494/95, and was buried there.

Works
In Persian:
 Sharh-e Golshan-e raz
 Atwar-e sab'a-ye qalb
 Kalemat va Maqalat

In Arabic:
 Jame al-tanzil wa ta'wil
 Sharh-e estelahat al-sufiya

References

Sources
 

People from Bitlis
1490s deaths
Kurdish Sufis
15th-century Persian-language writers
Arabic-language writers
Kurdish writers
Sufi writers